Wells Andrews Hutchins (October 8, 1818 – January 25, 1895) was an American lawyer and politician who served as a U.S. Representative from Ohio during the American Civil War.

Early life and education 
Born in Hartford, Ohio, Hutchins was a first cousin to future congressman John Hutchins. He attended public schools and then taught school. He later studied law and was admitted to the bar in 1841. He commenced practice in Warren, Ohio.

Career
In 1842, Hutchins moved to Portsmouth, Ohio, where he served as a member of the State house of representatives in 1852 and 1853. He was a Whig while in Portsmouth. He was the city solicitor from 1857 to 1861. He was an unsuccessful candidate in 1860 to the Thirty-seventh Congress. During the early part of the Civil War, he was the United States provost marshal for the state of Ohio in 1862.

Congress 
Hutchins was elected as a Democrat to the Thirty-eighth Congress (March 4, 1863 – March 3, 1865).  A War Democrat, he supported Abraham Lincoln's agenda at critical moments.  Hutchins called the proclamation Lincoln issued on September 15, 1863 under the authority of the Habeas Corpus Suspension Act of 1863 "necessary" in order to defeat the rebellion.  He was one of only 16 Democrats in the House of Representatives who joined with the Republicans and voted to ratify the Thirteenth Amendment to the United States Constitution on January 31, 1865.  That amendment abolished slavery in the United States.  By doing so, he became one of a group who had "defied their party discipline, and had deliberately and with unfaltering faith marched to their political death", according to abolitionist Congressman James Mitchell Ashley.

He was an unsuccessful candidate in 1864 for reelection to the Thirty-ninth Congress, and again in 1880 to the Forty-seventh Congress.

Later career and death 
Hutchins resumed the practice of law in Portsmouth and died there January 25, 1895. He was interred in Greenlawn Cemetery. He died of kidney disease.

On February 23, 1843, Hutchins married Cornelia Robinson of Portsmouth.

Legacy

A Congressman loosely based on him is portrayed by actor Walton Goggins in the 2012 film Lincoln.

Notes

References

External links
 Retrieved on 2009-04-29

1818 births
1895 deaths
People from Trumbull County, Ohio
People from Portsmouth, Ohio
Ohio lawyers
Ohio Whigs
People of Ohio in the American Civil War
Members of the Ohio House of Representatives
Deaths from kidney disease
19th-century American politicians
19th-century American lawyers
Democratic Party members of the United States House of Representatives from Ohio